The 1990 tournament championship game was played at Rutgers University in front of 19,070 fans. The Syracuse Orangemen defeated the Loyola Greyhounds, 21–9.

Tournament overview
Syracuse's participation in the tournament was later vacated by the NCAA Committee on infractions. Syracuse was found to have violated rules when coach Roy Simmons, Jr.'s wife Nancy Simmons co-signed a car loan with Paul Gait. Roy Simmons, Jr.'s 3-0 record as well as Paul Gait's 7 goals and 7 assists in this tournament are not recognized by the NCAA.

This Syracuse team is notable for being undefeated and featuring the Gait brothers, Paul and Gary Gait as well as hall-of-famer Tom Marechek, and is generally considered one of the best teams in NCAA lacrosse history.

The Orangemen won three consecutive titles from 1988 to 1990. They became the first team to win three in a row since Johns Hopkins from 1978 to 1980. The 1990 team scored more than 20 goals in 10 games this season, including 20 or more goals over the three NCAA tournament teams. Their closest game was a 15-12 win over Penn. During the Gait's four years at Syracuse, the team won 50 games with 5 losses and won three straight national titles (one of which was vacated by the NCAA).

Jon Reese had a tremendous season for Yale, scoring an NCAA record 82 goals out of the midfield and leading Yale to a 15 and 1 regular season. This was Yale's second only NCAA tournament appearance and they received the second seed in the tournament, making it to the Final Four.

Tournament results 

 * = Overtime

Tournament boxscores

Tournament Finals

Tournament Semi-finals

Tournament Quarterfinals

References

External links 
 Division I Men's Lacrosse History

NCAA Division I Men's Lacrosse Championship
NCAA Division I Men's Lacrosse Championship
NCAA Division I Men's Lacrosse Championship
NCAA Division I Men's Lacrosse Championship